FSW may stand for:
 Fanhui Shi Weixing, a series of Chinese recoverable satellites
 Faso Airways, a Burkinabe airline
 Feet sea water, a unit of pressure
 Fellowship of Southern Writers, an American arts organization
 Female sex worker
Flight Software (Avionics Software)
 Florida SouthWestern State College
 Forward-swept wing
 Fox Sports World (disambiguation), various meanings
 Fox Sports World Canada
 Free Speech Week, in the United States
 Freestyle walking
 Freestyle wrestling
 Friction stir welding
 Full Spectrum Warrior, a video game